Maine South High School (officially known as Maine Township High School South) is a public four-year high school located in Park Ridge, Illinois, a northwest suburb of Chicago, Illinois, in the United States. It is part of Maine Township High School District 207, which also includes Maine East High School and Maine West High School.

Maine South is well known for its academic, athletic, and fine arts success. Since at least 1992 it has also received mention in national media as the alma mater of Hillary Clinton, a member of the school's first graduating class.

History
Bids on the construction of Maine South opened on March 18, 1963. Maine South was built in 1964 on the grounds of a former landfill to meet the growing educational needs of the area, mainly the city of Park Ridge, but also some of Niles, Harwood Heights, Norridge, and unincorporated Chicago.

The first principal, Clyde Watson, was appointed in December 1963, in order to give him time to begin forming the first parents and music booster clubs.

Until 1969, students were under a dress code that included a requirement for men to be clean shaven, and that hair had to be cut above the collar. 1969 also saw the first expansion of the school with the addition of the student cafeteria, and some physical education and classroom areas.

In 1973, the North Central Association, an academic accreditation agency, rated Maine South as "one of the top 10 high schools in the nation."

In 1986 and 1987, officials from Maine South were instrumental in pushing the Illinois High School Association to recognize girls soccer.

The 1988–1989 school year saw Maine South recognized by the United States Department of Education as a Blue Ribbon School.

In 1996, after several decades of existing in the shadow of nearby O'Hare International Airport, the school received federal funds which allowed for the installation of soundproof windows, air conditioning, and sound dampening ceilings. The project began in 1997 and took three years to complete.

1998 saw the completion of the last major addition to the building: a sixteen classroom, four laboratory extension on the east end of the academic wing.

In 2008, graduation ceremonies, which since the first graduating class had been held on campus (except for the 2004 graduating ceremonies, which were held at Harper Community College due to the construction of the new bleachers), were moved to the nearby Rosemont Theatre.

Over the summer of 2009, the athletic stadium had lights and an artificial turf surface installed.

In July 2011, the Guinness World Records certified that the Maine South class of 2014 had set a world record for the most multiple birth sets in the same academic year (16 sets of twins and 3 sets of triplets).

Academics

Maine South's academic programs range from remedial/academy class, to accelerated honors/AP classes. Based on performances in 2008, Maine South is ranked 11th among public non-magnet high schools in the state of Illinois, ranked according to a standardization of Prairie State Achievement Examination (PSAE) scores. Maine South is ranked 9th by the Chicago Tribune among public non-magnet high schools in Illinois, ranked according to average PSAE scores.

The Foreign Language Department offers five-year programs in French, German, Italian, and Spanish, and a four-year program in Mandarin.

Student life

Academic competition
In 1999, the team won the national competition in Washington D.C.

In 2007, the school's Scholastic Bowl team won the state championship tournament sponsored by the Ancient, Free, & Accepted Masons of Illinois.

The chess team won IHSA State Championships in 2001–02, 2002–03, & 2006–07.

Athletics
Maine South sponsors teams for both boys and girls in basketball, cross country, golf, gymnastics, lacrosse, soccer, swimming & diving, tennis, track & field, volleyball, and water polo. Boys are also able to compete in baseball, football, and wrestling, while girls are able to compete in badminton, cheerleading, and softball.

Maine South competes in the Central Suburban League South Division. In state competition, Maine South competes in the largest potential school classes in each sport sponsored by the Illinois High School Association.

The following teams have won IHSA sponsored State Championship Tournaments:

Basketball (boys): 1978–79
Football: 1995–96, 2000–01, 2008–09, 2009–10, 2010–11, 2016–17
Swimming & Diving (girls): 1975–76
Volleyball (boys): 2005–06
Dance Team (Hawkettes): 2013

In addition, the girls soccer team won three consecutive unofficial State Championship Tournaments in 1983–84, 1984–85, and 1985–86, prior to the IHSA sanctioning soccer for girls. Over that time, the team went 60-0-4. From 1985 to 1987, the team scored in 62 consecutive matches, which is an Illinois state record among girls teams, and would be second if boys teams were also included.

The Maine South Hawkettes dance team won UDA National Championships in High Kick in 2011, 2017, 2019, and 2022.

Maine South football has been one of the most successful programs in Illinois in recent history. Maine South went to the 8A State Championship game 6 out of 8 years between 2003 and 2011. During that stretch, Maine South was runner up from 2003 to 2005 and won three consecutive state championships from 2009 to 2011. The team has qualified for the IHSA playoffs each year since 1992, and has only two losing seasons since 1980. Only six teams in the State of Illinois have longer active streaks qualifying for the playoffs (through 2012–13). Maine South has not lost a conference football game since 2000 participating in the Central Suburban League. Maine South is well known for their football program throughout the nation. They were ranked first in state from 2009 to 2012 during which produced 3 of 4 Illinois Player of the Year in Charlie Goro (2009, QB), Matt Perez (2010, RB), and Matt Alviti (2012, QB). Maine South is also known as QB High. The previous 6 starting QBs have received scholarships to Division I (NCAA) programs, with 5 of 6 accepting the Division I (NCAA) scholarships.

Sean Price: Central Michigan (MAC)
Tyler Knight: Northern Illinois (MAC)
Jimmy Coy: Saint Xavier University (NAIA Player of the Year)
Charlie Goro: Vanderbilt (SEC)
Tyler Benz: Eastern Michigan (MAC)
Matt Alviti: Northwestern (Big 10)

Clubs
Maine South supports 79 student organizations running the gamut from academic competition and performing arts to public service and special interest clubs.

Among the organizations, from the standpoint of national or international notability, are branches or chapters of the National Forensic Association, Quill and Scroll, SADD, Tri-M, DECA, Mu Alpha Theta, National Honor Society, and Amnesty International.

WMTH (WMTH-TV/FM) is a club that is connected with broadcasting classes at Maine South and at the other schools in the district. The radio station broadcasts on 90.5 FM and can be heard within the Park Ridge, Illinois area, as well as through a webcast through the district webpages. The transmitting tower for the station is located at Maine East High School. The club also films the Maine South Hawks home football games.

Fine arts
The school sponsors several musical groups, including: marching band, concert band, two symphony bands, chamber orchestra, three symphony orchestras, a jazz band, and many choirs. In addition, there are four theatrical performances per year including a musical each spring, a play in the fall and winter, and a variety show in the fall.

The marching band has performed at several major events, including the 1981 Cherry Blossom Festival parade in Washington D.C, the 1984 Cotton Bowl Classic. It later performed at the 1996, 1999, and 2001 Orange Bowl Parades. The band also performed at the 1993 Presidential Inauguration Parade, as a representative of First Lady Hillary Rodham Clinton's alma mater.

In 2001, the Grammy Foundation named Maine South a Signature School.

In 2009 and 2011, violinist Mark Wood taught a series of workshops to the members of the school orchestra in preparation for a concert he performed with them.

Notable alumni

Politics and law
 Hillary Rodham Clinton (1965), former First Lady of the United States (1993–2001), U.S. Senator from New York (2001–2009), United States Secretary of State (2009–2013), two-time presidential candidate, and nominee of the Democratic Party for President of the United States in the 2016 election. Clinton only attended Maine South during her senior year, which coincided with Maine South's first year of existence. For her first three years of high school, she attended Maine East.
 Mark Filip, federal district court judge for the Northern District of Illinois (2004–08)
 Hugh Rodham (1968), politician
 Tony Rodham (1972), political consultant
 Penny Pullen (1965), former Illinois State representative and conservative activist

Arts and entertainment
 Danny Corkill (1992), child actor.
 Greg Glienna (1981), screenwriter
 Dave Mallow (1966), voice actor
 Frank Merle (1997), filmmaker
 John Pankow (1973), actor
 Sean Giambrone, actor known for TV series The Goldbergs

Athletics
 Dave Bergman (1971), Major League Baseball first baseman
 Dave Butz (1969), NFL defensive lineman
 Tom Hoff (1991), indoor U.S. volleyball Olympian (2000, 2004, 2008)
 Nancy Swider (1974), Olympic speedskater (1976, 1980, 1984, 1988)
 Jim Walewander (1980), Major League Baseball player
 Joe Zdeb, Major League Baseball outfielder (1978–79)
 Adam Rosales (2001), major league baseball third baseman
 Jim Rushford, Major League Baseball outfielder
 David Santee (1975), Olympic figure skater (1976, 1980)
 Brian Schlitter, professional baseball pitcher
 Boris Shlapak, professional football and soccer player

Other
 Susan Lindquist, microbiologist
 Karen McCarron, murderer
 Ray Ozzie (1973), software industry entrepreneur
 Janet Shamlian (1980), journalist, NBC news correspondent

References

External links 

 Official website
 Selected articles from Southwords highlighting the history of Maine South
 Maine South High School Alumni website
 WMTH Alumni website
 IHSA season records for Maine South athletics and activities

Park Ridge, Illinois
Educational institutions established in 1964
Public high schools in Cook County, Illinois
1964 establishments in Illinois